Manuel Vicente Romerogarcía (Venezuela, 1861 - Aracataca, Colombia, August 22, 1917), was a Venezuelan writer, telegrapher and politician best known for his novel Peonía (1890).

References

1861 births
1917 deaths
Venezuelan male writers
Male novelists
19th-century Venezuelan novelists
19th-century male writers